The 2015 Metro Atlantic Athletic Conference men's basketball tournament was the postseason men's basketball tournament for the Metro Atlantic Athletic Conference for the 2014–15 NCAA Division I men's basketball season. It was held from March 5–9, 2015 at the Times Union Center in Albany, New York. No. 3 seed Manhattan upset No. 1 seed Iona 79–69 in the championship game and received the conference's automatic bid to the 2015 NCAA tournament. This was Manhattan's second consecutive MAAC tournament championship, and their third straight appearance in the championship game, with all three games also being against Iona.

Seeds
All 11 teams in the conference participate in the Tournament. The top five teams will receive byes to the quarterfinals. Teams are seeded by record within the conference, with a tiebreaker system to seed teams with identical conference records.

Schedule

Bracket

References

MAAC men's basketball tournament
2014–15 Metro Atlantic Athletic Conference men's basketball season
College basketball tournaments in New York (state)
Basketball competitions in Albany, New York
MAAC men's basketball tournament
MAAC men's basketball tournament